(1676–1744) was a Japanese samurai of the Edo period. A senior retainer of the Sendai domain, he was first known as Muratoshi (村利). Retired in 1743 in favor of his adopted son Murakiyo. Murasada was the seventh Katakura Kojūrō. His childhood name was Matakuro (又九郎).

Family
 Father: Katakura Kagenaga (2nd)
 Mother: Jōshōin
 Adopted Son: Katakura Murakiyo

External links
Katakura family tree (in Japanese)
Katakura-related timeline (in Japanese)

Samurai
1676 births
1744 deaths
Karō
Katakura clan